Vangelis Petrakis (born 7 September 1938) is a Greek former footballer who played as a goalkeeper.

Club career
Petrakis started his football career at Aris Ptolemaidas and in the summer of 1957 he took the first big step of his career, as he transferred to Aris. With the "yellows" he won the Macedonia FCA Championship in 1959, while finishing sixth place in the Panhellenic Championship. He replaced Dimitris Akparidis under the posts of Aris and in the first year of the first national division, he was a key member of the team's squad. On 22 January 1962, he was blamed for a 2–5 loss to Panathinaikos, with his teammates and club officials asking him to take off his shirt and leave during the match. The team management found him guilty of deliberately underperforming and punished him with a ban from the club's activities for the next few months. He returned in the away match against Panathinaikos on 10 June 1962, where with an amazing performance he kept a clean sheet, even saving a penalty, gave the team of Thessaloniki a 0–1 win.

In the summer of 1962, he transferred to AEK, where he played for five years, but in the shadow of Stelios Serafidis. He was involved in some of the team's heaviest defeats, including the away 7–2 by Monaco for the European Cup, the 4–5 by Panathinaikos and the 4–0 by Olympiacos. During his spell at AEK he won a league title in 1963 and 2 Cups. In 1967, he transferred to OFI, where he played for four seasons, having managed to celebrate the promotion to the first division in 1968 and to compete in it with the team from Heraklion for the next 3 years, until his retirement from football in 1971.

International career
Petrakis was the main goalkeeper of the then Greece military team, where he made 22 appearances and was a key and irreplaceable member of the team that won the World Military Cup in 1962</ref> and 1963.

Honours

Aris
Macedonia FCA Championship: 1959

AEK Athens
Alpha Ethniki: 1962–63
Greek Cup: 1963–64, 1965–66

Greece military 
World Military Cup: 1962, 1963

References

Greek footballers
Association football goalkeepers
1938 births
Super League Greece players
Aris Thessaloniki F.C. players
AEK Athens F.C. players
OFI Crete F.C. players
Footballers from Central Macedonia
People from Thessaloniki (regional unit)
Living people